Nawkata is a village in Kamrup, situated in north bank of river Brahmaputra.

Transport
Nawkata is accessible through National Highway 31. All major private commercial vehicles ply between Nawkata and nearby towns.

See also
 Nizdemoria
 Guakuchi

References

Villages in Kamrup district